Stachybotrys chartarum, also known as black mold or toxic black mold, is a species of microfungus that produces its conidia in slime heads. It is sometimes found in soil and grain, but the mold is most often detected in cellulose-rich building materials, such as gypsum-based drywall and wallpaper, from damp or water-damaged buildings.

Taxonomy
The fungus was originally described scientifically in 1818 by Christian Gottfried Ehrenberg as a member of the genus Stilbospora. His diagnosis emphasized the form of the spores, which he described as minute, sub-opaque, ovate, and agglomerated into subconcentric, water-soluble irregular clusters. He noted that the fungus adheres to paper, sometimes forming circles dotted with black. Stanley Hughes transferred the taxon to Stachybotrys in 1958. This genus was circumscribed in 1832 by Czech mycologist August Carl Joseph Corda, with Stachybotrys atra assigned as its type species. The species concept of Stachybotrys chartarum has been controversial, as several studies showed that there were several closely related species and cryptic species all under this name.

Growth, reproduction, and habitat
S. chartarum is a slow-growing mold that does not compete well with other molds. It is only rarely found in nature, and seldom encounters the kind of living environment occasionally produced by human habitation (i.e., large amounts of cellulose, large temperature fluctuations, low nitrogen, no other molds, no sunlight, and ample constant humidity). The spores are only released into the ambient air when the mold is mechanically disturbed, particularly when wet. It is considered an uncommon contaminant of most indoor air.

Not all strains of S. chartarum produce mycotoxins, and under certain conditions some of these lose the ability to produce such toxins over time; the presence of high indoor humidity does not imply that mycotoxin-producing S. chartarum is also present; even intense exposure in a laboratory setting of rats to vapors from walls entirely covered in S. chartarum resulted in few notable biological effects (possibly because the air contained almost no spores, possibly because the walls were not disturbed during the experiment). In another experiment, mice exposed to concentrations of mycotoxins from S. chartarum much greater than a human could obtain in any living environment showed no ill effects. According to one author, "These studies suggest that the concentrations of airborne spores of S. chartarum realistically obtainable in indoor air are too low to produce clinical effects."

Toxicity
Claims of health problems related to this mold have been documented in humans and animals since the 1930s. More recently, S. chartarum has been linked with so-called sick building syndrome. However, the link has not been firmly established in the scientific literature.

In 1994 the US Center for Disease Control verified that a number of infants in Cleveland, Ohio became sick, and some died from pulmonary hemosiderosis (bleeding in the lungs) following exposure to unusually high levels of S. chartarum spores. Subsequent investigation by the CDC did not reveal a definitive link between mold exposure and the infant deaths.

There are two chemotypes in S. chartarum, one that produces trichothecene mycotoxins such as satratoxin H and one that produces atranones.

See also

 Bioaerosol
 Mold growth, assessment, and remediation
 Mold health issues

Notes

References

External links
 Stachybotrys chartarum: The Toxic Indoor Mold Archived from APSnet. American Phytological Society
 Questions & Answers on Stachybotrys chartarum & Other Molds CDC National Center for Environmental Health
 

Stachybotryaceae
Fungi described in 1818
Taxa named by Christian Gottfried Ehrenberg
Building biology
Hypocreales genera